Shustovo is a rural locality (a village) in Saryevskoye Rural Settlement, Vyaznikovsky District, Vladimir Oblast, Russia. The population was 214 as of 2010. There are 4 streets.

Geography 
Shustovo is located 40 km northwest of Vyazniki (the district's administrative centre) by road. Okhlopkovo is the nearest rural locality.

References 

Rural localities in Vyaznikovsky District